Lawrence Nene Kofi Tetteh, (born 15 May 1964) also known as Reverend Canon Dr Lawrence Tetteh, is a Ghanaian tele-evangelist, philanthropist, Chaplain of the Ghana Christian Council of the UK and Ireland, Author, international economist, lecturer and founding President of the Worldwide Miracle Outreach with its international headquarters based in London, United Kingdom.

Early life and education
He was born in Jamestown, Accra a Ga-Dangme royal lineage to Sampson Kwadjo Tetteh of Dodowa and Juliana Norchoe Tetteh of Osu in the Greater Accra Region of Ghana. He attended the Corvinus University of Budapest of Economics Sciences in Hungary and the London School of Economics (LSE) in the United Kingdom. As he was pursuing his PhD programme in international relations at Corvinus he was ordained a Reverend Minister by Dr. T. L. Osborn and Archbishop Benson Idahosa in the United Kingdom.

Career
Tetteh was ordained a Reverend Minister by Dr T. L. Osborn and Archbishop Benson Idahosa and founded the Worldwide Miracle Outreach. He is a teacher of the gospel and the author of the books Dangers of Offence, Count your Blessings and Benefits of the Anointing. He is a televangelist, a philanthropist, a public speaker and the host of Miracle Touch TV programme worldwide. He is also a visiting lecturer in Economics and International Relations in various universities.

He has worked and ministered with other ministers of God such as Oral Roberts and Richard Roberts (evangelist) of the Oral Roberts University and Ministries, T. L. Osborn, Kenneth E. Hagin, Archbishop Desmond Tutu, Morris Cerullo Archbishop Benson Idahosa, Benny Hinn, Pastor Ayo Oritsejafor, Dr Richard Shakarian and others. He is a charismatic Christian preacher who collaborates in national crusades and evangelism with other mainstream and Pentecostal churches to spread the gospel throughout Ghana and the rest of the world. These churches include the Anglican, Methodist, Presbyterian, Catholic, Apostolic, and Assemblies of God churches. His sermons transcend the boundaries of ecumenical relationships and works.

He was the main speaker of the first National crusade of the Methodist Church Ghana in 2002 held at the Independence Square in Accra, Ghana. He also organised the Asanteman for Christ Crusade together with Dr Richard Roberts of the Oral Roberts Evangelistic Association at the Kumasi sports stadium with Otumfour Osei Tutu II, the king of the Ashanti Kingdom as the special guest of honour.

He has been a speaker at the Full Gospel Business Men's Fellowship International (FGBMFI), and was main speaker for the world convention at Florida, U.S. in 2008 and in Yerevan, Armenia in 2013.

He was the main speaker for the first-ever National Presbyterian Church of Ghana Crusade and The Anglican Church Crusade all at the Independence Square Accra.

Tetteh was inducted as an Honorary Canon  by the The Anglican Church in 2017 by the Archbishop Daniel Sarfo, who was then the Primate of the Church of the Province of West Africa.

Philanthropy works
Tetteh gifted a taxi driver who returned about 8,400 Ghanaian cedis he found in his taxi back to the owner with a new car. This was after the action of the driver went viral on social media.<ref>{{Cite web |last=Amartey |first=Geraldo |date=2022-05-13 |title=Any car you want, I'll pay - Lawrence Tetteh promises honest taxi driver |url=https://yen.com.gh/people/207122-amazing-honest-taxi-driver-promised-a-car-by-lawrence-tetteh-ddd/ |access-date=2022-12-17 |website=Yen.com.gh - Ghana news. |language=en}}</ref>

Controversial statements
Lawrence Tetteh was reported to have said that he didn't believe in the spirituality of the Christian all night vigil services. But in a rebuttal Lawrence Tetteh mention that what he was against was rather the excesses of those who organize these all night services.

He was also reported to have said that religious leaders should always practice what they preach about to their congregations.

He was reported to have said that herbal medicine in Ghana is not a fetish but some middle class Ghanaians want to make it so and the earlier that notion was dispelled the better.

Lawrence Tetteh also spoke about how some musicians and businesses were taking advantage of Ebony Reigns death to make profits.

He also spoke on prophecies in Ghana and how in recent times it has been abused by a some men of God. This statement by him supported the call by the Ghana Police Service on actions they are taking to check the publication of death prophecies.

In 2018 he called on the Prince of Wales who was the head of the Commonwealth at the time to use his office to grant amnesty to law abiding Ghanaian citizens who do not have regular stay in the United Kingdom.

In December 2022 the Ghana Police released a statement warning pastors in Ghana about making so called doom prophecies and in a sharp rebuttal Lawrence Tetteh granted an interview saying that the Ghana Police can not gag clergymen from making panic prophecies. He mentioned that even though there are some recalcitrant pastors that shouldn't stop the good pastors who are doing the right thing.

On September 13, 2022, Lawrence Tetteh signed the book of condolences at the British High Commission in Accra, Ghana in which he eulogised the Queen for bringing hope to everyone especially the United Kingdom and Commonwealth.

 Awards and recognition 
 Inducted as an Honorary Canon in the Anglican Church in 2017 by the Archbishop Daniel Sarfo, Primate of the Church of the Province of West Africa in 2017.
 Appointed ambassador of peace by the United Nations Federation of Peace in South Korea.   
 Received Hungarian highest award in March 2022, the Knight Cross of the Order of Merit of Hungary from the President of Hungary.
 Inducted as National Patron of the Boys' Brigade of the Methodist Church of Ghana.
The National Clergy Association of Ghana (NACAG) Eminent African Peace Maker Award.
Appointed Advisor to Hungary-Africa Knowledge Centre.

Personal life
Tetteh is married to Barbara Tetteh who is an ordained minister, an administrator and a social scientist. He also has seven siblings namely, Alex Tetteh, Prince John Tetteh, Lady Gifty Dede Tetteh, Ebenezer Tetteh, Victoria Tetteh Ackah, Princess Tetteh Cudjoe and Michelle Grace Tetteh Caesar.

Books
Lawrence Tetteh has authored a number of books;Benefits of AnnointingCount your BlessingsDangers of OffenceGod is AbleDo Miracles Still Happen?The Power of PrayerChanging Your DestinyPossessing your PossessionsExperiencing the Power of GodUnderstanding DeliveranceWitchcraft in the ChurchThe Name of JesusThis Nonsense must StopLord I Need a MiracleWhosoever BelievesThe Power of PraiseUnderstanding the AnnointingThe Power of SilenceStaying in your Calling''

References

External links
 Lawrence Tetteh books

Living people
Ghanaian Christians
Ghanaian theologians
Ghanaian religious leaders
Ghanaian clergy
1964 births